Fijałkowski is a surname. Notable people with the surname include:

 Antoni Melchior Fijałkowski (1778–1861), former Archbishop of Warsaw
 Czesław Młot-Fijałkowski (1892–1944), Polish brigadier general
 Pete Fijalkowski (born 1968), English vocalist, guitarist, and songwriter

Polish-language surnames